The Muco River is a river in the Araucanía Region in Chile. It is a tributary of the Cautín River.

See also
List of rivers of Chile

References
 EVALUACION DE LOS RECURSOS HIDRICOS SUPERFICIALES EN LA CUENCA DEL RIO BIO BIO
 http://www.tageo.com/index-e-ci-v-04-d-m1321113.htm

Rivers of Araucanía Region
Rivers of Chile